Raventós i Blanc is a Spanish winery and family business in Sant Sadurní d'Anoia founded in 1497.

The estate of the Raventós family covers about 90 hectares of vineyards and woodlands. The winery produces natural wine. Pepe Raventós is the twenty-first generation of his family to work the estate. In 1872, Josep Raventós Fatjó made the first bottle-fermented wine in Spain using native Spanish grape varieties.

See also 
List of oldest companies
Juvé y Camps
Freixenet 
 Codorníu

References

External links 
Homepage

Wineries of Spain
Companies established in the 15th century
15th-century establishments in Spain